Richard Göransson (born 8 August 1978 in Örebro) is a Swedish auto racing driver. He is a 4-time champion of the Swedish Touring Car Championship winning it for West Coast Racing in 2004, 2005, 2008 and 2010. He won the Scandinavian Touring Car Championship in 2016 for Polestar Cyan Racing.

Career

He started racing in karting from 1989 through to 1993. In 1996 he was Swedish Formula Ford Champion. He also competed in both the British and European Formula Ford Championships. He won the European Formula Ford Championship in 2001. In 2002 he raced in some rounds of the British Formula Renault, before moving to the STCC in 2003 where he finished fifth in his first season.

His time in the STCC has been very successful. After winning back-to-back titles for West Coast Racing in 2004 and 2005, he switched to Flash Engineering in 2006 and drove alongside team owner Jan "Flash" Nilsson for three years. In 2008 he was champion for the third time.  In 2009 he returned to WCR and regained the drivers title in 2010.

He was winner of the European Touring Car Cup held at Vallelunga in 2005.

Racing record

WRC results

Complete FIA European Rallycross Championship results

Supercar

Complete FIA World Rallycross Championship results

Supercar

RX Lites Cup

External links
Profile at Speedsport Magazine.

1978 births
Living people
Swedish racing drivers
Formula Ford drivers
British Formula Renault 2.0 drivers
Formula Renault Eurocup drivers
Swedish Touring Car Championship drivers
ADAC GT Masters drivers
World Rallycross Championship drivers
European Touring Car Cup drivers
Sportspeople from Örebro
Rowe Racing drivers
Nürburgring 24 Hours drivers
Jenzer Motorsport drivers